Maram may refer to:

 Maram people, tribals of northeast India
 Maram language, a Naga language of India
 Maram language (Austroasiatic), also of India
 Maram (horse) (2006–2012), an American female Thoroughbred racehorse
 Maram (drum), a percussion instrument from South India
 Maram (film), an Indian film released in 1973

See also
 Marram grass, a species of grasses in genus Ammophila